This is a list of the French SNEP Top 200 Singles and Top 200 Albums number-ones of 2023.

Number ones by week

Singles chart

Albums chart

See also
 2023 in music
 List of number-one hits (France)
 List of top 10 singles in 2023 (France)

References

France
2023
2023 in French music